Hörbiger is a surname. Notable people with the surname include:

 Attila Hörbiger (1896–1987), Austrian actor
 Christiane Hörbiger (1938–2022), Austrian actress
 Hanns Hörbiger (1860–1931), Austrian engineer and pseudoscientist
 Mavie Hörbiger (born 1979), German-Austrian actress
 Paul Hörbiger (1894–1981), Austrian actor
 Thomas Hörbiger (1931–2011), German actor and lyricist